In geometry, the Minkowski sum of two sets of position vectors A and B in Euclidean space is formed by adding each vector in A to each vector in B:
 

The Minkowski difference (also Minkowski subtraction, Minkowski decomposition, or geometric difference) is the corresponding inverse, where  produces a set that could be summed with B to recover A.  This is defined as the complement of the Minkowski sum of the complement of A with the reflection of B about the origin.
 
 

This definition allows a symmetrical relationship between the Minkowski sum and difference. Note that alternately taking the sum and difference with B is not necessarily equivalent. The sum can fill gaps which the difference may not re-open, and the difference can erase small islands which the sum cannot recreate from nothing.
 
 
 
 

In 2D image processing the Minkowski sum and difference are known as dilation and erosion.

An alternative definition of the Minkowski difference is sometimes used for computing intersection of convex shapes. This is not equivalent to the previous definition, and is not an inverse of the sum operation. Instead it replaces the vector addition of the Minkowski sum with a vector subtraction. If the two convex shapes intersect, the resulting set will contain the origin.
 

The concept is named for Hermann Minkowski.

Example 

and

then their Minkowski sum is

which comprises the vertices of a hexagon.

The empty set is important in Minkowski addition, because the empty set annihilates every other subset: for every subset S of a vector space, its sum with the empty set is empty:

The Minkowski sum of a closed ball and an open ball is an open ball. More generally, the Minkowski sum of an open subset with  other set will be an open subset. 

This shows that the Minkowski sum of two closed sets is not necessarily a closed set. However, the Minkowski sum of two closed subsets will be a closed subset if at least one of these sets is also a compact subset.

Convex hulls of Minkowski sums
Minkowski addition behaves well with respect to the operation of taking convex hulls, as shown by the following proposition: 

This result holds more generally for any finite collection of non-empty sets:

In mathematical terminology, the operations of Minkowski summation and of forming convex hulls are commuting operations.

If  is a convex set then  is also a convex set; furthermore  

for every . Conversely, if this "distributive property" holds for all non-negative real numbers,  then the set is convex.

The figure to the right shows an example of a non-convex set for which 

An example in  dimension is:  It can be easily calculated that  but  hence again 

Minkowski sums act linearly on the perimeter of two-dimensional convex bodies: the perimeter of the sum equals the sum of perimeters. These two facts can be combined to give a short proof of Barbier's theorem on the perimeter of curves of constant width.

Applications
Minkowski addition plays a central role in mathematical morphology. It arises in the brush-and-stroke paradigm of 2D computer graphics (with various uses, notably by Donald E. Knuth in Metafont), and as the solid sweep operation of 3D computer graphics.  It has also been shown to be closely connected to the Earth mover's distance, and by extension, optimal transport.

Motion planning
Minkowski sums are used in motion planning of an object among obstacles. They are used for the computation of the configuration space, which is the set of all admissible positions of the object.  In the simple model of translational motion of an object in the plane, where the position of an object may be uniquely specified by the position of a fixed point of this object,  the configuration space are the Minkowski sum of the set of obstacles and the movable object placed at the origin and rotated 180 degrees.

Numerical control (NC) machining
In numerical control machining, the programming of the NC tool exploits the fact that the Minkowski sum of the cutting piece with its trajectory gives the shape of the cut in the material.

3D solid modeling
In OpenSCAD Minkowski sums are used to outline a shape with another shape creating a composite of both shapes.

Aggregation theory
Minkowski sums are also frequently used in aggregation theory when individual objects to be aggregated are characterized via sets.

Collision detection 
Minkowski sums, specifically Minkowski differences, are often used alongside GJK algorithms to compute collision detection for convex hulls in physics engines.

Algorithms for computing Minkowski sums

Planar case

Two convex polygons in the plane
Assume that the edges of a polygon are given and the direction, say, counterclockwise, along the polygon boundary. Then it is easily seen that these edges of the convex polygon are ordered by polar angle. Imagine that these edges are solid arrows which can be moved freely while keeping them parallel to their original direction. Assemble these arrows in the order of the sequence  by attaching the tail of the next arrow to the head of the previous arrow.

Other
If one polygon is convex and another one is not, the complexity of their Minkowski sum is O(nm). If both of them are nonconvex, their Minkowski sum complexity is O((mn)2).

Essential Minkowski sum
There is also a notion of the essential Minkowski sum +e of two subsets of Euclidean space. The usual Minkowski sum can be written as

Thus, the essential Minkowski sum is defined by

where μ denotes the n-dimensional Lebesgue measure. The reason for the term "essential" is the following property of indicator functions: while

it can be seen that

where "ess sup" denotes the essential supremum.

Lp Minkowski sum

 

For p ≥ 1, Firey defined the Lp Minkowski sum  of compact convex sets  K and  L in  containing the origin as
 

By the Minkowski inequality, the function h is again positive homogeneous and convex and hence the support function of a compact convex set. This definition is fundamental in the Lp Brunn-Minkowski theory.

See also

 
 , an inequality on the volumes of Minkowksi sums
 
 
 
 
  (a.k.a. Quermassintegral or intrinsic volume)

Notes

References

 

 

 
.
.
.
.

External links

 
 
 Minkowski Sums, in Computational Geometry Algorithms Library
 The Minkowski Sum of Two Triangles and The Minkowski Sum of a Disk and a Polygon by George Beck, The Wolfram Demonstrations Project.
 Minkowski's addition of convex shapes by Alexander Bogomolny: an applet
 Wikibooks:OpenSCAD User Manual/Transformations#minkowski by Marius Kintel: Application
 Application of Minkowski Addition to robotics by Joan Gerard

Abelian group theory
Affine geometry
Binary operations
Convex geometry
Digital geometry
Geometric algorithms
Hermann Minkowski
Sumsets
Theorems in convex geometry
Variational analysis